"Lloran Las Rosas" (English: The Roses Cry) is a  Latin ballad written by Alfredo Matheus Diez and performed by Mexican singer-songwriter Cristian Castro. It was released by BMG U.S. Latin on November 3, 1997 as the fourth single from his fifth studio album Lo Mejor de Mí (1997). In 2012, Castro recorded a live version of "Lloran Las Rosas" as a vallenato duet with Colombian musicians Jorge Celedón and Jimmy Zimbrano. This version was included on his second live album Primera fila: Día 2 in 2014.

Chart performance

Music video
A music video, directed by J.C. Barros, was shot in 1998.

Covers
In 2000, salsa musician Dominic covered the song which peaked at No. 21 on the Hot Latin Songs chart. In 2005, brazilian duo Bruno & Marrone also covered the song in a portuguese version, called "choram as rosas".

References

1997 singles
1997 songs
Cristian Castro songs
Sony BMG singles
1990s ballads
Pop ballads
Rock ballads
Spanish-language songs
Song recordings produced by Rudy Pérez